The National Solidarity Party (abbreviation: NSP) is an opposition  political party in Singapore.

History

Beginnings
The NSP was founded by a group of middle-class businessmen and women on 6 March 1987. The founding president and secretary-general of the party were Kum Teng Hock and Soon Kia Seng respectively. Kum was a former member of the ruling People's Action Party (PAP) while Soon was the ex-chairman of the Singapore Democratic Party.

According to its 1995 manifesto, the main political objective of the NSP was to organise and maintain a democratic movement that would ensure the solidarity and establishment of a just political system and standard of living. The party believed in a multi-party political system so that the rights and interests of the people could be proportionately represented. The NSP also aimed to establish an open and freely competitive economic environment that would provide sufficient opportunities for local enterprises. Today, the NSP continues to strive for these values. It continues to promote the establishment of a multi-party political system as well as a pro-business economic environment.

NSP made their political debut in the 1988 general election, and has contested in every election since. NSP also had contested in the 1992 by-election for the constituency of Marine Parade GRC, which was led by then-Prime Minister Goh Chok Tong.

As member of Singapore Democratic Alliance
Ahead of the 2001 general election, the NSP became a founding member of the Singapore Democratic Alliance (SDA), along with the Singapore Justice Party (SJP), the Singapore People's Party (SPP) and the Singapore Malay National Organization (PKMS). The Chairman of the alliance was the SPP leader and then-Member of Parliament (MP) for Potong Pasir, Chiam See Tong (who was the SDA's only candidate-elect until 2011).

On the polling day, the party's then-secretary General Steve Chia, who contested the Chua Chu Kang Single Member Constituency but defeated with a vote share of 34.6%, was the highest percentage secured by a losing opposition candidate at the election, and Chia assumed his Non-Constituency Member of Parliament (NCMP) post, becoming the first non-Workers' Party (WP) NCMP to do so.

However, despite Chia losing his election but increased his margin to 39.63% in the 2006 general election, he lost his position as a NCMP and did not return to Parliament (the highest percentage among losing candidates was for the WP team of Aljunied GRC at 43.9%; party's chairman Sylvia Lim succeeded Chia for the NCMP role).

Party rebuild and the 2011 general election
In 2007, the NSP decided to withdraw from the SDA with a view to "explore new possibilities through wider latitude to manoeuvre, re-engineer, and rebuild the NSP". Sebastian Teo also took over the leadership of the party from Steve Chia. The party acquired a new collective colour of orange for their activity jersey as a sign of vitality, rebirth and unity, and the newsletter underwent a transformation and adopted the new name North Star.

In the 2011 election, the party fielded the most candidates of all Opposition parties for the election, with 24 candidates contesting in four Group Representation Constituencies (Chua Chu Kang GRC, Jurong GRC, Marine Parade GRC and Tampines GRC), and four Single Member Constituencies (Mountbatten SMC, Pioneer SMC, Radin Mas SMC and Whampoa SMC; the latter was currently defunct). This election saw a boost in electoral support for the NSP, notably receiving endorsement from the newly formed Reform Party along their supporters. The party was led by then Secretary-General Goh Meng Seng (a former WP candidate, and currently the leader for People's Power Party), and saw introductions to prominent candidates, which include Nicole Seah, Hazel Poa, Tony Tan Lay Thiam and Jeanette Chong-Aruldoss.

However, despite fielding notable candidates such as former MP Cheo Chai Chen and entrepreneur Hazel Poa, the undefinable branding took a huge toll on the party by a lack of a strong party brand, as the party was defeated in all eight of the contested constituencies; Goh resigned from his post shortly after the election.

General Election 2015
The party expressed intention to contest five constituencies (MacPherson, Marine Parade, Pioneer, Sembawang and Tampines), but the party shortly dropped out on MacPherson and Marine Parade, citing the possibility of multi-cornered contests that were likely to dilute the votes from the incumbent opposition WP and reducing the chance for a more diverse Parliament.

The party later changed their mind a few days later, and announced their intention to contest MacPherson SMC citing closeness with the constituency as they had contested there in the prior election. In a response, a few party members, such as acting secretary-general Hazel Poa and a CEC member Fazli Talip, resigned from NSP, citing that they were strongly opposed on a very controversial decision to contest MacPherson. The party initially fielded Chia as the candidate, but he later withdrew on 23 August due to the online abuse that received from him, and the party eventually chose Cheo as a candidate. Prior to the election, few members had earlier resigned, which members include Nicole Seah and Jeanette Chong-Aruldoss, who later joined WP and SPP, respectively.

During the campaigning period, Cheo drew public outcry on an interview citing MacPherson's incumbent Tin Pei Ling's status as a new mother was "her weakness" and saying that she might spend more time focusing on her child than on her constituents, and later claimed it as a joke. On 8 September, Tampines GRC candidate Choong Hon Heng's rally on booing PAP had gone viral.

The party failed to win any of the constituencies, and Cheo had his S$14,500 electoral deposit forfeited as a consequence of garnering less than 12.5% of the valid votes cast for MacPherson (215 or 0.82%).

Earlier, Lim Tean was appointed as acting-secretary general following Poa's resignation, but resigned from his post and left NSP in May 2017, and formed his new party, Peoples Voice, in October 2018.

General election 2020
The party fielded a total of 10 candidates and contested Sembawang and Tampines in the 2020 elections. The party also expressed interest in contesting MacPherson and Pioneer, but both withdrew and respectively backed the People's Power Party and Progress Singapore Party. Ahead of elections, Steve Chia also resigned from NSP and participated the Singapore People's Party and became the new secretary-general a year later.

On polling day on 10 July, the party neither won any GRCs, but improved their both shares for popular vote and overall vote share by 25.27% and 3.53% to 33.15% and 3.76%, respectively. Former NSP and now-PSP member Hazel Poa however fell short on being elected in the West Coast GRC (whose team led by former PAP MP and 2011 presidential candidate Tan Cheng Bock) in about a 4% margin, but by-virtue on having the best performing result among losing candidates, Poa became a Non-constituency Member of Parliament along with Leong Mun Wai.

Ideology
In late-2007, the NSP formulated a set of political objectives and mission statements. According to its website, these are:

Political Ideology: The National Solidarity Party believes in a multi-political system that upholds economic progress and nation-building as the twin pillars of a strong and vibrant Singapore where the supremacy of the citizenry is respected and the natural rights of every individual may be enjoyed in harmony with a fair and equitable society.

Mission Statements: NSP exists to uphold democracy and to provide constructive policies. The Party positively promotes the establishment of a multi-party political system. It envisions to be a credible and caring political party in the pursue of rational and responsible politics in the interest of Singapore and Singaporeans.

Core Values: 
 The Right to Dignity
 Respect for Diversity
 Service to Society

Leadership

List of secretaries-general

19th Central Executive Council

Electoral history

Parliamentary elections
Due to a merger with the Singapore Democratic Alliance in the 2001 and 2006 elections, the number of candidates represented by the National Solidarity Party was displayed in parenthesis; the number of elected seats represented shown first was for the National Solidarity Party, and the next by SDA.

Parliamentary By-elections

 Though no NSP candidates was elected in the 2001 election, one candidate from the NSP had the best score among losing candidates and was made a member of NCMP.

Notes

See also

 List of political parties in Singapore

References

External links

1987 establishments in Singapore
Democratic socialist parties in Asia
Political parties established in 1987
Political parties in Singapore
Socialist parties in Singapore